Al-Jebbah (also spelled al-Jibbeh) is a village in southern Syria, administratively part of the Rif Dimashq Governorate, located northeast of Damascus in the Qalamoun Mountains. Nearby localities include Ma'loula and al-Qutayfah to the southeast, Hosh Arab and al-Tawani to the south and Assal al-Ward and Rankous to the southwest. According to the Syria Central Bureau of Statistics, al-Jibbah had a population of 2,829 in the 2004 census. Its inhabitants are predominantly Sunni Muslims.

References

Bibliography

Populated places in Yabroud District